St. Clair is a city in Blue Earth County, Minnesota, United States, located along the Le Sueur River. The population was 750 at the 2020 census. It is part of the Mankato-North Mankato Metropolitan Statistical Area.

History
St. Clair was originally called Hilton, and was platted under the latter name in 1865. St. Clair was incorporated in 1907; the present name is in honor of General James St. Clair.

Geography

Minnesota State Highway 83 and County Highway 15 are two of the main routes in the community.

Demographics

2010 census
As of the census of 2010, there were 868 people, 303 households, and 225 families living in the city. The racial makeup of the city was 97.1% White, 1.2% African American, 0.1% Native American, 0.1% Pacific Islander, and 1.5% from two or more races. Hispanic or Latino of any race were 3.1% of the population.

There were 303 households, of which 42.9% had children under the age of 18 living with them, 61.4% were married couples living together, 8.9% had a female householder with no husband present, 4.0% had a male householder with no wife present, and 25.7% were non-families. 20.1% of all households were made up of individuals, and 8.3% had someone living alone who was 65 years of age or older. The average household size was 2.86 and the average family size was 3.32.

The median age in the city was 33.6 years. 31% of residents were under the age of 18; 8.4% were between the ages of 18 and 24; 26.6% were from 25 to 44; 25.6% were from 45 to 64; and 8.5% were 65 years of age or older. The gender makeup of the city was 48.2% male and 51.8% female.

2000 census
As of the census of 2000, there were 827 people, 295 households, and 220 families living in the city. The racial makeup of the city was 100.00% White. Hispanic or Latino of any race were 0.73% of the population.

There were 295 households, out of which 44.1% had children under the age of 18 living with them. 62.4% were married couples living together, 7.5% had a female householder with no husband present, and 25.4% were non-families. 21.4% of all households were made up of individuals, and 10.2% had someone living alone who was 65 years of age or older.  The average household size was 2.80 and the average family size was 3.29.

In the city, the population was spread out, with 32.3% under the age of 18, 8.5% from 18 to 24, 31.4% from 25 to 44, 18.3% from 45 to 64, and 9.6% who were 65 years of age or older. The median age was 32 years. For every 100 females, there were 98.8 males.  For every 100 females age 18 and over, there were 95.1 males.

The median income for a household in the city was $43,854, and the median income for a family was $50,333. Males had a median income of $32,050 versus $22,102 for females. The per capita income for the city was $19,512. About 3.6% of families and 7.2% of the population were below the poverty line, including 7.8% of those under age 18 and 18.1% of those age 65 or over.

Education
St. Clair has a public K-12 school system, St. Clair Public Schools, with one school building. The building contains a K–6 school, St. Clair Elementary School, and a 7–12 high school, St. Clair Secondary School.

References

External links
 City of St.Clair Minnesota
 City-Data.com
 ePodunk: Profile for Saint Clair, Minnesota

Cities in Blue Earth County, Minnesota
Cities in Minnesota
Mankato – North Mankato metropolitan area